The Texas Eagle is a  daily passenger train route operated by Amtrak between Chicago and San Antonio in the central and western United States. Prior to 1988, the train was known as the Eagle.

Trains #21 (southbound) and 22 (northbound) also convey a sleeping car and a coach (designated internally as Trains #421 and 422) to/from the Sunset Limited between San Antonio and Los Angeles on the days that tri-weekly train operates. However, the Texas Eagle itself was reduced to tri-weekly service from October 2020 to March 2021 and again from January 2022 until March 2022 due to the COVID-19 pandemic. When operating in conjunction with the Sunset Limited, the westbound continuing cars join with the Sunset Limited in San Antonio; the eastbound continuing cars split off in San Antonio for the journey to Chicago.

During fiscal year 2019, the Texas Eagle carried 321,694 passengers, a 4.2% decrease over FY2018. In FY2016, the train had a total revenue of $22,323,171, an 8.5% decrease from FY2015.

History

Amtrak's Texas Eagle is the direct successor of the Missouri Pacific Railroad and Texas and Pacific Railway train of the same name, which was inaugurated in 1948 and ultimately discontinued in 1971. The route of Amtrak's Texas Eagle is longer (Chicago to San Antonio versus St. Louis to San Antonio), but much of today's route is historically a part of the original Texas Eagle route. St. Louis to Texarkana and Taylor, Texas, to San Antonio travels over former Missouri Pacific Railroad trackage, while the Texarkana to Fort Worth segment traverses the former Texas and Pacific Railway. The T&P merged with MoPac in 1982; in turn MoPac was acquired by Union Pacific in 1986.

The Eagle began on October 2, 1981, as a restructuring of the Inter-American, which had operated a daily schedule from Chicago to Laredo, Texas, via San Antonio since 1973. From 1979 onward, it operated a section to Houston, Texas, which diverged at Temple, Texas. The new Eagle dropped the Houston section, while its southern terminus was cut back from Laredo to San Antonio. The new train carried Superliner equipment, replacing the Amfleet coaches on the Inter-American. In addition, the new train ran on a thrice-weekly schedule with a through car on the Sunset Limited to Los Angeles, although the latter was not announced until the April 1982 timetable.

On November 15, 1988, Amtrak revived a Houston section, this time diverging at Dallas and running over the route of the Southern Pacific's Sunbeam. It was the first time passenger traffic had served that route since 1958. Amtrak had intended to operate the Lone Star over this route back in the 1970s, but dropped the plan in the face of obstruction from the Southern Pacific. With the change, Amtrak revived the name Texas Eagle for the thrice-weekly Chicago-San Antonio/Houston train, while the off-day Chicago–St. Louis train remained the Eagle. This section would be discontinued on September 10, 1995. On April 4, 2013 Amtrak opened a new station in Hope, Arkansas, the hometown of former U.S. president Bill Clinton.  was added on November 17, 2016, serving Iron County, Missouri.

As part of Amtrak's response to the COVID-19 pandemic resulting in greatly depressed ridership, service was reduced to tri-weekly throughout the corridor October 11, 2020. In March 2021, Amtrak announced plans to return the Texas Eagle to its pre-pandemic schedule on May 24, 2021. However, the train began operating on a five days per week schedule in January 2022 due to a resurgence of the virus caused by the Omicron variant and remained so until March 2022.

Proposed changes
In the August 2009 issue of Trains, Brian Rosenwald, Amtrak's chief of product management, noted that the Sunset Limited might be replaced by an extension of the Texas Eagle to Los Angeles: "We projected the revenue and looked at the logistics, and with a little bit of rescheduling came to the conclusion that we can make this happen with the equipment we have, and the additional revenue the train earns will more than cover the increased operating costs". The move would restore a connection to the Coast Starlight in both directions, and move boarding in Maricopa and Tucson, Arizona, to civilized times. "We are putting a stake in the ground: Triweekly needs to disappear," Rosenwald said. While the route of the Sunset Limited would not be entirely replaced, the performance improvements listed explain what will happen:
Conversion to daily Chicago–Los Angeles train
Shortening of the schedule by 9 hours
San Antonio–New Orleans stub service on a daily basis to connect with this train
Use of the Diner-Lounge on the stub service

These changes would, in turn, create a through-car change similar to that of the Empire Builder. Such service would originate from Los Angeles and split at San Antonio, and vice versa from New Orleans.

Ridership

Route description

After St. Louis, the train skirts the Ozark Mountains, stopping in Poplar Bluff, Missouri, before crossing the state line into Arkansas. The northbound Texas Eagle leaves San Antonio at 7 am (splitting from the eastbound Sunset Limited on Tuesdays, Fridays and Sundays) and arrives at Chicago at 1:44 pm the next day.

Rolling stock
The normally assigned consist on the Texas Eagle includes:

 GE Genesis locomotive
 Superliner Sleeper
 Superliner Diner-Lounge (Cross Country Café)
 Superliner Coach
 Superliner Coach
The train once featured a Superliner Sightseer Lounge. That car has been removed since October 2020. The decision concerning whether or not it will return remains in question.

Three times a week, one coach and one sleeping car from the Texas Eagle are connected to the Sunset Limited and travel between San Antonio and Los Angeles as Train #421/422.

Additionally, to provide extra capacity, an additional Superliner coach operates between Chicago and St. Louis as Train #321/322.

References

Notes

External links

Texas Eagle timetable – July 18, 2022

Amtrak routes
Railway services introduced in 1988
Passenger rail transportation in Illinois
Passenger rail transportation in Missouri
Passenger rail transportation in Arkansas
Passenger rail transportation in Texas
Passenger rail transportation in New Mexico
Passenger rail transportation in Arizona
Passenger rail transportation in California
Night trains of the United States
Railway services discontinued in 1988
Long distance Amtrak routes